Balchriston Level Crossing Halt was a railway halt near Culzean Castle, South Ayrshire, Scotland. The halt was part of the Maidens and Dunure Light Railway.

History
Open in 1906 it closed on 1 December 1930. As the name might imply, it was next to a level crossing.

References

Notes

Sources
 
 
 
 
 Article in British Railway Journal No 8 Summer 1985 Wild Swan Publications
 Balchriston site named on navigable O.S. map half way between disused Glenside and Knoweside stations

External links
 RAILSCOT on Maidens and Dunure Railway

Disused railway stations in South Ayrshire
Railway stations in Great Britain opened in 1906
Railway stations in Great Britain closed in 1930
Former Glasgow and South Western Railway stations